The National Museum of Ras Al Khaimah (Arabic: متحف رأس الخيمة) is a museum located in the emirate of Ras al-Khaimah, in the north of the United Arab Emirates. The museum contains archaeological collections and historical artifacts of the country.

History
The fort which was built in the 16th century, this fort was attacked by the British in 1819 due to allegations of pirate attacks. The fort was used as a ruler's residence until 1964, then the fort was used as a police station and later as a prison. In 1984, work began on converting the building into a museum, the project was led by Jayanth Laxman. The museum opened for the first time in 1987. During the first year of opening, Merschel Schenkel donated a collection of shells to the museum. The museum's fossils were donated by the Ecology Group of Dubai, which were collected between 1984 and 1986. Based on historical sources as well as information from the Emirati government, the original fort before the attacks by Europeans was known as "Early Fort", after the attacks, the reconstructed fort based on the original building where the museum is now located is known as "Late Fort", some sources give the name of the building as "Al Hisn Fort".

Collections

The museum's collections were partially donated by city residents and the Quwasim family. The museum contains collections of pottery, archaeological illustrations, site reconstructions, and typologies dating from the Iron Age, the Sassanian period and the early Islamic period. The museum also has a collection of fishing nets. The museum contains a 19th century coin found in the Falaya Palace, where the peace treaty between the British and the Trucial States was signed, this coin is called "Mardhouf Al Quwasim". In addition the museum contains a madbasa, an artifact used syrup 2000 years ago, a 12th century gold coin, and 4000-year-old palm seed found at the Shamal Bronze Age settlement site. The museum contains cylindrical seals from Wadi al-Qawr. The museum contains a gravestone with an inscription referring to David, son of Moses, which was discovered in 1998 around the area of Shamal. In October 2020, the museum launched the Tamra exhibition, about the importance and history of the date palm tree in cultural practices and heritage in the region. The museum contains antique weapons and antiquities found in the Emirate of Ras Al Khaimah, in addition the museum has a special room dedicated to silverware containing a collection of silver jewelry.

References

1986 establishments in the United Arab Emirates
Museums established in 1986
National museums of the United Arab Emirates
History museums in the United Arab Emirates
Archaeological museums
Buildings and structures in Ras Al Khaimah
Buildings and structures completed in the 16th century